Reginald Porter Rust (May 23, 1909 – January 1984) was an American football running back in the National Football League for the Boston Braves.  He played college football at Oregon State University.

1909 births
1984 deaths
Sportspeople from Santa Barbara, California
Players of American football from California
American football running backs
Boston Braves (NFL) players
Oregon State Beavers football players